Lake Elizabeth is a shallow glacial lake in Kandiyohi County, in the U.S. state of Minnesota.; it was named after the wife of a local land official. Lakes Ella and Carrie nearby were named for their daughters.

References

See also
List of lakes in Minnesota

Lakes of Minnesota
Lakes of Kandiyohi County, Minnesota